Sky Raiders is a 12-episode 1941 Universal film serial. The serial was directed by Ford Beebe and Ray Taylor. Sky Raiders stars Donald Woods, Billy Halop, Robert Armstrong and Eduardo Ciannelli. Sky Raiders has little in common with Universal’s other early-1940s espionage outings like Sea Raiders or Junior G-Men, although the serial is often lumped in together as if it is part of a series.

Plot
Former World War I ace pilot Captain Bob Dayton, (Donald Woods) is the owner of Sky Raiders, Inc., an aircraft company. Dayton has designed a bombsight and a new high speed fighter aircraft, the "Sky Raider".  Dayton recruits young Tim Bryant (Billy Halop), a member of Air Youth of America, to help him.

Nazi agent Felix Lynx (Eduardo Ciannelli) attempts to steal these designs for his own country. Lynx is determined to seize this valuable new aircraft, with the help of his female accomplice Innis Clair (Jacqueline Dalya) and of a criminal named John KAne who happens to be a perfect double for Dayton.  All attempts, however, to steal the fighter aircraft prototype, fail.

Dayton's new bombsight is being tested in Hawaii, and Lynx intercepts a Sikorsky S-45 flying boat on the way to Honolulu. After it is shot down, Dayton and his secretary Mary Blake (Kathryn Adams) who were on board, were rescued by a government cutter.

Lieutenant Carry (Robert Armstrong) and Tim meet the survivors but find that Lynx has sent his henchmen to finish the job. The foreign agents are killed when they hit an oncoming truck. Mary announces that she has become Mrs. Dayton.

Chapter titles
 Wings of Disaster!
 Death Rides the Storm
 The Toll of Treachery
 Battle in the Clouds
 The Fatal Blast
 Stark Terror!
 Flaming Doom
 The Plunge of Peril
 Torturing Trials
 Flash of Fate
 Terror of the Storm
 Winning Warriors!
Source:

Cast

 Donald Woods as Captain Bob Dayton / John Kane,  World War I ace and co-owner of Sky Raiders, Inc.
 Billy Halop as Tim Bryant, member of the Air Youth of America
 Robert Armstrong as Lieutenant Ed Carey, co-owner of Sky Raiders, Inc.
 Eduardo Ciannelli as Felix Lynx, Nazi agent
 Kathryn Adams as Mary Blake, Sky Raiders, Inc.'s secretary
 Jacqueline Dalya as Innis Clair 
 Jean Fenwick as The Countess Irene
 Reed Hadley as Caddens, one of Lynx's henchmen
 Irving Mitchell as R.S. Hinchfield 
 Edgar Edwards as Teal, one of Lynx's henchmen
 John Holland as Hess, one of Lynx's henchmen
 Roy Gordon as Major General Fletcher 
 Alex Callam as Captain Long 
 Phil Warren as Bakeman, the crackpot with gun
 Bill Cody, Jr. as Jack Hurd, a young boy

Production
Many exterior shots for Sky Raiders were made at the Grand Central Air Terminal, Glendale, California. A rare Phillips 1-B Aeroneer appears in the serial. Bob Dayton's personal aircraft is a Fairchild 24W-9 (c/n W-101, NC18688).

Aerial photography was a mixture of "fairly effective combinations of process-screen shots, (obvious) model work, stock footage and actual flying work by stunt pilot Jerry Jerome."

The aircraft used in Sky Raiders are:

 Bell YFM-1 Airacuda
 Fairchild 24W-9, c/n W-101, NC18688, c/n 2689, NC15346
 Fairchild Super 71 c/n 646, NC9174
 Kellett KD-1 
 Monocoupe 90 c/n 526, NC192K (archive images) 
 Pitcairn PCA-2 Autogiro AC-35 c/n J-91, NX70 
 Phillips 1-B Aeroneer, c/n 1, NX16075
 Sikorsky S-45 
 Spartan Executive 7W, c/n 7-W12, NC17613

Stunts

 Dave O'Brien
 Tom Steele
 Ken Terrell

Reception
Reviewer Hans J. Wollstein, wrote in his review of Sky Raiders for Allmovie, "Universal catered to the young fans of aviation with this airborne serial, which featured a plucky kid –'Bowery Boy' Billy Halop – and plenty of 'sky riders'. Famous aviator Bob Dayton (Donald Woods) hires a bright member of the Air Youth of America, Tim (Halop), to help him finalize a hush-hush project: a new type of fighter plane and bombsight. This being 1941, plenty of enemy agents are after the invention, including the nefarious Felix Lynx (Eduardo Cianelli). It takes Dayton, Tim, and the co-owner of Sky Raiders, Inc., Lieutenant Ed Carey (Robert Armstrong) 12 breathless chapters before they are able to defeat the enemy. The final installment was quite appropriately entitled 'Winning Warriors'."

See also
 List of film serials
 List of film serials by studio
 Junior G-Men
 Junior G-Men (serial)

References

Notes

Citations

Bibliography

 Cline, William C. "Filmography". In the Nick of Time. Jefferson, North Carolina: McFarland & Company, Inc., 1984. .
 Farmer, James H. Celluloid Wings: The Impact of Movies on Aviation (1st ed.). Blue Ridge Summit, Pennsylvania: TAB Books 1984. .
 Lovell, Mary S. The Sound of Wings: The Life of Amelia Earhart. New York: St. Martin's Press, 1989. .
 Rainey, Buck. Serials and Series: A World Filmography, 1912–1956. Jefferson, North Carolina: McFarland & Company, Inc., 2010. . 
 Weiss, Ken and Ed Goodgold. To be Continued ...: A Complete Guide to Motion Picture Serials. New York: Bonanza Books, 1973. .

External links
 
 

1941 films
American aviation films
American black-and-white films
1940s English-language films
Universal Pictures film serials
Films directed by Ford Beebe
Films directed by Ray Taylor
1941 adventure films
American adventure films
1940s American films